Christopher Andrew Hill (born 3 November 1987) is an English professional rugby league footballer who plays as a  for the Huddersfield Giants in the Super League, and England and Great Britain at international level.

He previously played for the Leigh Centurions in the Championship. and Warrington Wolves (Heritage № 1099)

Early career

Playing career

Leigh Centurions
He made his first senior appearance for Leigh in the 2005 Super League X season, during a 8–74 defeat by St Helens.

In 2006, Hill won the Northern Rail Cup with Leigh after consolidating his place in the side. He toured Australia with Great Britain Under-18s in this same year.

2011 saw Hill win his second Northern Rail Cup trophy with Leigh, featuring as Halifax were defeated 16-20 at Blackpool's Bloomfield Road Stadium.

Hill accumulated a couple of accolades with Leigh; firstly in reaching 100 appearances for the club, and also being the most recent -forward for Leigh to score a hat-trick of tries. After missing only one game in two years, he was made captain of Leigh in 2010.

Warrington Wolves
In 2011, Hill's impressive displays in the Championship saw him earn a three-year deal with Warrington in Super League, which saw him join the Warrington squad in 2012, remaining with Leigh on a dual registration until the end of the 2011 season. In light of this, his then-coach Ian Millward predicted future national caps for Hill, with his nurturing at Warrington.

Hill was selected to start in the 2012 Challenge Cup Final victory over Leeds at Wembley Stadium.

At the end of Hill's first season with Warrington, Hill was named as player of the season, players’ player of the season and won the Vice President's award, thus taking each of the major accolades at the Warrington end of season awards night.

Hill played in the 2012 Super League Grand Final defeat by Leeds at Old Trafford.
Hill played in the 2013 Super League Grand Final defeat by Wigan at Old Trafford.

In 2016, Hill was named club captain of the Warrington outfit. This was a successful year overall for the Warrington club under Hill, as they reached both finals and won their first piece of silverware since 2016, when they won the League Leaders' Shield, the second time in the club's history. Hill was named in the Dream team for the season, and was also the Top Metre Maker of the season. He was rewarded for this amazing season with a contract extension with the club, which will keep him with the Warrington club until at least November 2021.  Hill played in the 2016 Challenge Cup Final defeat by Hull F.C. at Wembley Stadium.

Hill played in the 2016 Super League Grand Final defeat by Wigan at Old Trafford.

Hill played in the 2018 Challenge Cup Final defeat by the Catalans Dragons at Wembley Stadium.
Hill played in the 2018 Super League Grand Final defeat by Wigan at Old Trafford.

Hill played in the 2019 Challenge Cup Final victory over St. Helens at Wembley Stadium.

Huddersfield
On 10 September 2021, it was reported that he had signed for Huddersfield in the Super League On 14 April 2022, he made his 500th career appearance in a 20–20 draw against Leeds Rhinos.
On 28 May 2022, Hill played for Huddersfield in their 2022 Challenge Cup Final loss to Wigan.
In round 25 of the 2022 Super League season, Hill was controversially sin binned in Huddersfield's 18-14 loss to Leeds.

Personal life
In 2015, Hill set up a plumbing business, Premier Plumbing. On 12 September 2019 Hill opened a bathroom showroom called Immerse Bathroom Showroom.

International career
Chris made his International début for England in the 2012 Autumn International Series match against Wales in Wrexham.

In October and November 2013, Chris played in all 5 England matches of the Rugby League World Cup.

At the end of the 2014 domestic season, Chris traveled Down Under as part of the England national rugby league team's Four Nations squad.

In the 2015 International period, Chris was selected in Steve McNamara's 24-man squad to take on New Zealand up in England in a test-series. Before the series began England played a test match against France. Chris was part of the team that demolished the 'Les Tricolores'.

The following year, Hill was selected in England's 24-man squad for the 2016 Four Nations.

In October 2017 he was selected in the England squad for the 2017 Rugby League World Cup.

He was selected in squad for the 2019 Great Britain Lions tour of the Southern Hemisphere. He made his Great Britain test début in the defeat by Tonga.

Hill was named in the 2021 world cup squad for England.

References

External links

Warrington Wolves profile
SL profile
(archived by web.archive.org) Statistics at rlwc2017.com
England profile

1987 births
Living people
England national rugby league team players
English rugby league players
Great Britain national rugby league team players
Huddersfield Giants players
Leigh Leopards players
Rugby league players from Wigan
Rugby league props
Warrington Wolves captains
Warrington Wolves players